The men's individual all around event was an inaugural event at the Artistic Gymnastics World Championships. It was not held in 1992, 1996, and 2002.

Three medals are awarded: gold for first place, silver for second place, and bronze for third place. Tie breakers have not been used in every year. In the event of a tie between two gymnasts, both names are listed, and the following position (second for a tie for first, third for a tie for second) is left empty because a medal was not awarded for that position. If three gymnastics tied for a position, the following two positions are left empty.

Medalists

Bold number in brackets denotes record number of victories.

All-time medal count
Last updated after the 2022 World Championships.

Note
 Official FIG documents credit medals earned by athletes from Bohemia as medals for Czechoslovakia.

Multiple medalists

References

 FIG Results: 1903 World Artistic Gymnastics Championships
 FIG Results: 1905 World Artistic Gymnastics Championships
 FIG Results: 1907 World Artistic Gymnastics Championships
 FIG Results: 1909 World Artistic Gymnastics Championships
 FIG Results: 1911 World Artistic Gymnastics Championships
 FIG Results: 1913 World Artistic Gymnastics Championships
 FIG Results: 1922 World Artistic Gymnastics Championships
 FIG Results: 1926 World Artistic Gymnastics Championships
 FIG Results: 1930 World Artistic Gymnastics Championships
 FIG Results: 1934 World Artistic Gymnastics Championships
 FIG Results: 1938 World Artistic Gymnastics Championships
 FIG Results: 1950 World Artistic Gymnastics Championships
 FIG Results: 1954 World Artistic Gymnastics Championships
 FIG Results: 1958 World Artistic Gymnastics Championships
 FIG Results: 1962 World Artistic Gymnastics Championships
 FIG Results: 1966 World Artistic Gymnastics Championships
 FIG Results: 1970 World Artistic Gymnastics Championships
 FIG Results: 1974 World Artistic Gymnastics Championships
 FIG Results: 1978 World Artistic Gymnastics Championships
 FIG Results: 1979 World Artistic Gymnastics Championships
 FIG Results: 1981 World Artistic Gymnastics Championships
 FIG Results: 1983 World Artistic Gymnastics Championships
 FIG Results: 1985 World Artistic Gymnastics Championships
 FIG Results: 1987 World Artistic Gymnastics Championships
 FIG Results: 1989 World Artistic Gymnastics Championships
 FIG Results: 1991 World Artistic Gymnastics Championships
 FIG Results: 1992 World Artistic Gymnastics Championships
 FIG Results: 1993 World Artistic Gymnastics Championships
 FIG Results: 1994 World Artistic Gymnastics Championships (Individuals Competition)
 FIG Results: 1994 World Artistic Gymnastics Championships (Team Competition)
 FIG Results: 1995 World Artistic Gymnastics Championships
 FIG Results: 1996 World Artistic Gymnastics Championships
 FIG Results: 1997 World Artistic Gymnastics Championships
 FIG Results: 1999 World Artistic Gymnastics Championships
 FIG Results: 2001 World Artistic Gymnastics Championships
 FIG Results: 2002 World Artistic Gymnastics Championships
 FIG Results: 2003 World Artistic Gymnastics Championships
 FIG Results: 2005 World Artistic Gymnastics Championships
 FIG Results: 2006 Artistic Gymnastics World Championships
 FIG Results: 2007 Artistic Gymnastics World Championships
 Results: 2009 Artistic Gymnastics World Championships

World Artistic Gymnastics Championships
All-around artistic gymnastics